Monsanto is a former a US corporation.

Monsanto may also refer to:

Places 
Monsanto, Illinois, a community in the United States
Monsanto (Idanha-a-Nova), Portuguese town and former civil parish
Castelo de Monsanto, a castle in the town
Monsanto Forest Park, a park in Lisbon, Portugal
Circuito de Monsanto, a former race track

People 
Monsanto family, a Sephardic Jewish merchant family
Dionne Monsanto (born 1985), Filipina actress
Gus Monsanto (born 1974), Brazilian singer
Monsanto Pope (born 1978), American footballer

Other uses 
G.D.R. Monsanto, football club
Monsanto Canada, the Canadian division of Monsanto Company

See also